Karahamza is a village in the Meriç District of Edirne Province in Turkey.

References

Villages in Meriç District